Tyne and Wear is a metropolitan area covering the cities of Newcastle upon Tyne and Sunderland, as well as North and South Tyneside, Gateshead and Washington.

Tyne and Wear is well served by public transport, with the Tyne and Wear Metro, an extensive bus and rail network, the Shields Ferry, and Newcastle International Airport.

Tyne and Wear Passenger Transport Executive, trading as Nexus, are the passenger transport executive (PTE) responsible for overseeing the public transport network within Tyne and Wear, with headquarters at Nexus House in Newcastle upon Tyne.

Rail

History
Arguably, Newcastle upon Tyne had the world's first local railway, the Newcastle and North Shields Railway. The line opened in June 1839, originally running between North Shields station and Carliol Square.
The line was later extended to Tynemouth station,  (allowing through trains from the Blyth and Tyne Railway to run), before being further extended to Newcastle Central Station, in 1845.

Most of the railway was closed in 1973, with a section of the line re-opening (east of Heaton to Tynemouth) in November 1982, following the commencement of the Tyne and Wear Metro services between Tynemouth and St. James station.

Other historical rail alignments now served by the Tyne and Wear Metro include the Stanhope and Tyne Railway, and the Ponteland and Darras Hall Branch of the North Eastern Railway, amongst others.

Tyne and Wear Metro
The Tyne and Wear Metro is a light rail network linking South Tyneside and Sunderland with Gateshead, Newcastle upon Tyne, North Tyneside and Newcastle Airport.

The Metro is one of only two urban rail networks in the United Kingdom (outside London), with other cities have tram networks such as Edinburgh Trams, Manchester Metrolink and Sheffield Supertram.

In 201718, an estimated 36.4 million passenger-journeys were made on the Metro, making it the third-most-used tram and light-rail network in the United Kingdom, after London's Docklands Light Railway (121.8 million passenger-journeys) and the Manchester Metrolink (43.7 million passenger-journeys).

The Metro network currently consists of two lines:

Green Line: running from South Hylton Metro station and Sunderland Metro station to Newcastle City Centre, Regent Centre Metro station and Newcastle Airport Metro station.
Yellow Line: running from South Shields Metro station to Newcastle City Centre, Whitley Bay Metro station, Wallsend Metro station and St. James.

Both lines run as frequently every 12 minutes during the day (Monday to Saturday), and every 15 minutes in the evenings and on Sundays.

This allows for a combined service of every six minutes (Monday to Saturday), and every seven to eight minutes during the evening and on Sundays between Pelaw Metro station and South Gosforth Metro station.

Additional trains run during the morning and evening peak (Monday to Friday) between Pelaw and Regent Centre or Monkseaton Metro station. This provides a Metro every three minutes between Pelaw and South Gosforth Metro station at peak times.

National Rail
There are currently seven rail stations located within Tyne and Wear, these being: Blaydon, Dunston, Heworth, Manors, Metrocentre, Newcastle Central and Sunderland.

Newcastle Central is a key calling point on the East Coast Main Line. The station originally opened in August 1850, as part of the then Newcastle and Carlisle Railway and York, Newcastle and Berwick Railway.

Currently, the station is served by CrossCountry, LNER, Northern and TransPennine Express, with trains running to a range of destinations across the country.

CrossCountry run long-distance rail services connecting Scotland and the North East with the Midlands, South East and the South Coast. As of the December 2019 timetable change, service and frequency is as follows:

Two trains per hour heading south along the East Coast Main Line towards York, Sheffield and Birmingham New Street, with trains then continuing on to destinations including Bournemouth, Bristol Temple Meads, Cardiff Central, Oxford, Reading, Penzance and Plymouth.
An hourly service heading north along the East Coast Main Line towards Edinburgh Waverley, with a two-hourly service continuing on to Glasgow Central. Some trains further continue to Aberdeen or Dundee.

London North Eastern Railway provide long-distance, high-speed rail services, connecting Scotland and the North East with London. As of the December 2019 timetable change, service and frequency is as follows:

Two trains per hour running north along the East Coast Main Line towards Edinburgh Waverley, with some trains continuing on to Aberdeen, Glasgow Central, Inverness or Stirling.
Two trains per hour heading south along the East Coast Main Line towards York and London King's Cross.

Northern operates local rail services across the North East. As of the December 2019 timetable change, service and frequency is as follows:

An hourly service heading north along the East Coast Main Line to Morpeth, with two trains per day continuing on to Chathill.
An hourly service heading south along the Durham Coast Line towards Sunderland, Hartlepool, Middlesbrough and Nunthorpe, with some trains continuing on to Whitby.
Three trains per hour heading west along the Tyne Valley Line towards Hexham, with two trains per hour continuing on to Carlisle.

TransPennine Express links the North East England|North East with Yorkshire, Manchester and Liverpool. As of the December 2019 timetable change, service and frequency is as follows:

An hourly service heading north along the East Coast Main Line towards Edinburgh Waverley.
Two trains per hour heading south along the East Coast Main Line towards York, Leeds and Manchester Victoria, with an alternating hourly service continuing on to Liverpool Lime Street or Manchester Airport.

Sunderland station (then Sunderland Central) station opened in August 1879, under the then North Eastern Railway.

Nowadays the station is served by the Metro, with local rail services operated by Northern. The station is also served by less frequent, long-distance rail services, operated by Grand Central and LNER.

Northern provide an hourly service heading south along the Durham Coast Line towards Sunderland, Hartlepool, Middlesbrough and Nunthorpe (with some trains continuing on to Whitby), and an hourly service heading north to Newcastle, with trains then joining the Tyne Valley Line, continuing on towards Hexham.

In March 2002, following the extension of the Metro from Pelaw to Sunderland and South Hylton rail services between Sunderland and Newcastle were amended, with Heworth Interchange becoming the single intermediate station on the route between the two cities.

Former rail stations at Seaburn, East Boldon and Brockley Whins (as well as new purpose-built stations at St. Peter's, Stadium of Light and Fellgate) are now served by the Metro, with a frequency of up to five trains per hour, and a direct link to Newcastle Airport.

In January 2006, open-access operator Grand Central was granted permission to run four trains per day between Sunderland and London King's Cross via York, with services commencing in December 2007. As of April 2022, Grand Central operate five daily services along the route.

On 14 December 2015, Virgin Train East Coast began a once-daily direct train service between Sunderland and London King's Cross.

Air
Newcastle International Airport is the eleventh-busiest airport in the United Kingdom, with an estimated 5.3 million passenger-journeys made in 2018. It serves over 80 domestic, European and North African destinations, as well as direct flights to Cancún, Dubai and Orlando Sandford. The nearest similar-sized airports are Leeds Bradford Airport to the south and the larger Edinburgh and Glasgow airports to the north.

The airport is easily accessible by Metro, with up to five trains per hour serving Newcastle upon Tyne, Gateshead and Sunderland, with connections to North Tyneside and South Tyneside. It is also served by bus services from Newcastle upon Tyne, Woolsington, Ponteland and Darras Hall.

Bus

Tyne and Wear has an extensive bus network, which is overseen by the Tyne and Wear PTE. Bus services in the county are operated predominantly by three companies: Arriva North East, Go North East and Stagecoach North East. Additional services are also ran by a number of local independent operators.

Arriva North East operate from a single depot in the region (Jesmond), with local and regional bus services running from Newcastle upon Tyne to North Tyneside (Killingworth, North Shields, Tynemouth and Whitley Bay) and Northumberland (Alnwick, Ashington, Berwick-upon-Tweed, Blyth, Cramlington and Morpeth). The company also operates a network of services in and around the city of Sunderland, linking with towns and villages across East Durham.

Go North East operate local and regional bus services across the county, with services extending to County Durham (Chester-le-Street, Consett, Durham and Stanley), Northumberland (Corbridge, Hexham, Prudhoe and Ponteland) and Teesside (Middlesbrough and Stockton-on-Tees). The company operate from five depots in the region: Gateshead (Riverside and Saltmeadows Road), Percy Main, Sunderland (Deptford) and Washington.

Stagecoach North East provide mainly local services, with compact networks centring around the cities of Newcastle upon Tyne and Sunderland, as well as the seaside town of South Shields. The company operates from four depots in the region: South Shields, Sunderland, Slatyford and Walkergate.

There are a number of bus stations in the county, including: Gateshead, Eldon Square, Haymarket, Metrocentre and Park Lane. Connections with local bus services are also available at a number of Metro stations, including: Four Lane Ends, Heworth, Jarrow, Regent Centre, South Shields and Wallsend. A number of smaller bus stations are located at: Blaydon, Concord, Hetton-le-Hole, Killingworth, Washington Galleries and Winlaton.

Coach

Regional and national coach services operated by National Express depart from Newcastle coach station and Park Lane Interchange, with destinations including: Birmingham, Bristol, Chester, Edinburgh, Glasgow, Harrogate, Hull, Leeds, Liverpool, Manchester, Nottingham and London.

Services operated by Flixbus and Megabus also run from John Dobson Street in Newcastle upon Tyne, as well as Park Lane Interchange, with destinations including: Birmingham, Cardiff, Coventry, Cwmbran, Edinburgh, Glasgow, Leeds, London, Manchester and Sheffield.

Road
Many of the road designations in Tyne and Wear are recent. Upon completion of the Western Bypass in the early 1990s, and subsequent designation as the route of the A1, the roads between this route and the former through the Tyne Tunnel were renumbered. This saw many roads in the county change their 6-prefix to their present 1-prefix numbers. Major roads in the area include:
A1: This route stretches north to Alnwick, Berwick upon Tweed and Edinburgh, and south to Durham, Darlington, York and London.
A19: This route heads south from Seaton Burn to Sunderland via the Tyne Tunnel, then Peterlee, Middlesbrough, Thirsk, York and Doncaster.
A69: This  route heads west from Denton Burn to Carlisle, serving the towns and villages of Heddon-on-the-Wall, Corbridge, Hexham, Haydon Bridge, Haltwhistle, Brampton and Warwick Bridge along the route.
A167: This route runs south from Kenton Bar to Topcliffe (near Thirsk), and was the original Great North Road, prior to the opening of the A1(M) in the 1960s. It passes through Gateshead, Chester-le-Street, Durham, Darlington and Northallerton.
A696: This route heads north from Kenton Bar, serving Newcastle International Airport and Ponteland, as well as the villages of Belsay, Kirkwhelpington and Otterburn, before joining with the A68 to Carter Bar, Jedburgh, St Boswells, Lauder and Edinburgh.
A1058: The A1058, also known as the Coast Road, runs from Jesmond to Tynemouth, a route  in length.

Ferry
An international ferry terminal is located in the Royal Quays of North Shields. As of February 2020, there is a daily service running to and from Amsterdam IJmuiden. This service is operated by DFDS. Former routes from North Shields include Bergen, Haugesund and Stavanger.

A dedicated shuttle bus service (route 327), currently operated by Go North East, connects with the ferry, running to and from Newcastle Central Station.

The Shields Ferry also operates from North Shields, with the ferry landing located on Ferry Mews. This provides a half-hourly local service between North Shields and South Shields. This service is operated by Nexus.

Ticketing

Bus

Following the deregulation of bus services in 1986, bus operators in Tyne and Wear have been able to set their own routes, fares and timetables.

Rail

Local rail services in Tyne and Wear are operated by Northern. Tickets must be bought before travel at stations with ticketing facilities, these being Heworth, Newcastle and Sunderland. Passengers boarding at Blaydon, Dunston, Manors and Metrocentre can buy tickets on board the train.

Tyne and Wear Metro

The Tyne and Wear Metro has a simple fare structure, with the network being split in to three zones (A, B and C). Tickets are offered as single, day, week, four-weekly and annual.

Metro season tickets (weekly, four-weekly and annual) covering zone A are valid on bus services 53 and 54, as well as bus service Q3 between St Peter's Basin and Haymarket.

All Metro tickets (excluding single journey tickets) covering all zones are valid for travel on the Shields Ferry.

Further discounts are available for infrequent travellers with Pop PAYG, for students and young people with Pop & Pop Blue, and concessionary pass holders with a Metro Gold Card.

Shields Ferry

The Shields Ferry has a simple fare structure, offering single, day, week and four week tickets, as well as a carnet (10 tickets).

All Metro tickets (excluding single journey tickets) covering all zones are valid for use on the Shields Ferry.

During 2020, up to three children (under 11) can travel on the Shields Ferry for free at weekends, with a fare paying adult.

Multi-operator tickets

Multi-operator travel tickets are offered by Network One. A Network One travel ticket allows for unlimited travel on most buses, rail, Metro and the Shields Ferry, within the Tyne and Wear area. Tickets are zonal, with the area being split in to five numbered zones, and are available as DayRover (one day), week, four week and annual.

The TransFare ticket allows for a single journey to be made within Tyne and Wear using different types of transport (e.g. bus then Metro), provided that the final journey is started within 90 minutes of buying the ticket.

The area is divided in to three TransFare zones, the yellow, green and grey zones. The price of TransFare tickets can vary slightly, depending upon the transport operator selling the ticket. For journeys made more frequently using multiple operators, a Network One season ticket represents better value-for-money than the TransFare ticket.

Notes

References

External links